This is a list of former territorial authorities in New Zealand. "Territorial authority" is the generic term used for local government entities in New Zealand. Local government has gone through three principal phases with different structures: the provincial era, from 1853 to 1876; the counties and boroughs system from 1876 until 1989; and the current system of regions, cities and districts.

This article attempts to list all territorial authorities which have been disestablished.

Provincial era (until 1876)

The original three provinces were established in 1841 by Royal Charter. The New Zealand Constitution Act 1846 reduced the number of provinces to two. The New Zealand Constitution Act 1852 re-divided New Zealand into six provinces, and four additional provinces emerged during the remainder of the Provincial Era. This era came to end with the Abolition of Provinces Act 1876.

Post-provincial era (1876–1989)

After New Zealand abolished its provinces in 1876, a system of counties similar to other countries' systems was instituted, lasting with little change (except mergers and other localised boundary adjustments) until 1989 when they were reorganised into district councils within a system of larger regions.

The Local Government Act 1974 began the process of bringing urban, mixed, and rural councils into the same legislative framework. Substantial reorganisations under that Act resulted in a shake-up in 1989, which abolished all the counties except for the Chatham Islands County, which survived under that name for a further 6 years but then became a "Territory" under the "Chatham Islands Council".

Borough councils

New Zealand formerly used the term borough to designate self-governing towns of more than 1,000 people, although 19th century census records show many boroughs with populations as low as 200.

Cities
Prior to 1989, any borough with a population exceeding 20,000 could proclaim itself a city. As part of the restructuring, many provincial cities were combined with surrounding rural counties to form districts. For example, Hastings became a district, although its population is greater than nearby city Napier, which did not acquire any rural areas. The term city is still used informally for all large towns. Rotorua was a city from 1962 until 1979, when it amalgamated with Rotorua County to become Rotorua District. New Zealand's first city was Christchurch, proclaimed by royal charter in 1856.

Counties

When the provinces were abolished in 1876, 63 counties were established to govern rural areas. There were subdivisions and amalgamations over the next 113 years, with as many as 129 counties existing at once. Note that the designation of an area as a county often predated the formation of a county council. In the interim there was often a roads board as the only form of local administration. Fiord and Sounds counties never formed county councils, due to insufficient population to govern.

Districts
From the 1970s onwards some local authorities created by a voluntary amalgamation of two or more component local authorities were termed Districts. These Districts were of a mixed rural/urban character but are not to be confused with the Districts created by the local government reorganisation of 1989.

Town districts
A town district, as created under the Town Boards Act of 1882  was a municipality intermediate in nature between a county town and a borough. In 1952, a dependent town district could be established on the petition of two thirds of the resident householders of any settlement of at least fifty households in an area of not more than two square miles (5.18 km2). To become an independent town district, a town district must have had a population of greater than 500.

1989 reform of local government

By 1986, the number of territorial authorities and single-purpose authorities had grown to more than 850. In 1989 there was a major reform of local government in New Zealand. The numerous borough and county councils were amalgamated into larger districts, while the number of cities was reduced.

The lists above should include all local authorities that existed prior to 1989.

Post-1989 local government reform

Regions
13 regional councils were established through the passing of the Local Government Act 1987. Nelson-Marlborough Regional Council was disestablished in 1992, when its functions went to the unitary authorities Nelson, Tasman, and Marlborough.

Auckland Regional Council was subsumed into the Auckland Council on 1 November 2010.

City councils
Many of the city councils resulting from the 1989 reforms continue in operation. Seven territorial authorities (Auckland City Council, Manukau City Council, Waitakere City Council, North Shore City Council, Papakura District Council, Rodney District Council and Franklin District Council) were amalgamated into the Auckland Council in 2010.

District councils
Most of the districts resulting from the 1989 reforms continue in operation. Banks Peninsula District is an exception; it was merged into Christchurch City Council in 2006.

Footnotes

Notes

References

Territorial authorities
New Zealand

Former